The 81st United States Congress was a meeting of the legislative branch of the United States federal government, composed of the United States Senate and the United States House of Representatives. It met in Washington, D.C. from January 3, 1949, to January 3, 1951, during the fifth and sixth years of Harry S. Truman's presidency.

The apportionment of seats in this House of Representatives was based on the 1940 United States census.

The Democrats won back the majority in both chambers, and with the election of President Harry S. Truman to his own full term in office, this gave the Democrats an overall federal government trifecta.

Major events

 January 20, 1949: President Harry S. Truman began his second (only full) term.
 August 16, 1949: Office of Chairman of the Joint Chiefs of Staff created
 January 21, 1950: Accused communist spy Alger Hiss was convicted of perjury
 January 31, 1950: President Truman ordered the development of the hydrogen bomb, in response to the detonation of the Soviet Union's first atomic bomb in 1949
 June 27, 1950: Korean War: President Truman ordered American military forces to aid in the defense of South Korea

Major legislation

 June 20, 1949: Central Intelligence Agency Act, ch. 227, 
 October 25, 1949: Hospital Survey and Construction Amendments of 1949, ch. 722, 
 October 26, 1949: Fair Labor Standards Amendment, ch. 736, 
 October 31, 1949: Agricultural Act of 1949, ch. 792, 
 May 5, 1950: Uniform Code of Military Justice, ch. 169, 
 May 10, 1950: National Science Foundation Act, ch. 171, 
 August 15, 1950: Omnibus Medical Research Act,  (including Public Health Services Act Amendments, which established the National Institute of Neurological Diseases and Blindness)
 September 8, 1950: Defense Production Act of 1950, 
 September 12, 1950: Budget and Accounting Procedures Act of 1950, ch. 946, 
 September 23, 1950: McCarran Internal Security Act (including Subversive Activities Control Act of 1950), ch. 1024, 
 September 30, 1950: Performance Rating Act,  ch. 1123, 
 December 29, 1950: Celler–Kefauver Act (Anti-Merger Act), ch. 1184, 
 January 12, 1951: Federal Civil Defense Act of 1950, ch. 1228,  (codified in 50 U.S.C. App., here )

Treaties 
 July 21, 1949: North Atlantic Treaty ratified, establishing the North Atlantic Treaty Organization (NATO)

Hearings 

 May 11, 1950: Kefauver Committee hearings into U.S. organized crime began

Party summary

Senate

House of Representatives

Leadership

Senate
 President: Vacant until January 20, 1949
 Alben W. Barkley (D), from January 20, 1949
 President pro tempore: Kenneth McKellar (D)

Majority (Democratic) leadership 
 Majority Leader: Scott W. Lucas
 Majority Whip: Francis J. Myers
 Democratic Caucus Secretary: Brien McMahon
 Policy Committee Chairman: Scott W. Lucas

Minority (Republican) leadership 
 Minority Leader: Kenneth S. Wherry
 Minority Whip: Leverett Saltonstall
 Republican Conference Chairman: Eugene Millikin
 Republican Conference Secretary: Milton Young
 National Senatorial Committee Chair: Styles Bridges
 Policy Committee Chairman: Robert A. Taft

House of Representatives
 Speaker: Sam Rayburn (D)

Majority (Democratic) leadership 
 Majority Leader: John W. McCormack
 Majority Whip: Percy Priest
 Democratic Caucus Chairman: Francis E. Walter
 Democratic Caucus Secretary: Chase G. Woodhouse
 Democratic Campaign Committee Chairman: Michael J. Kirwan

Minority (Republican) leadership 
 Minority Leader: Joseph W. Martin Jr.
 Minority Whip: Leslie C. Arends
 Republican Conference Chairman: Roy O. Woodruff
 Policy Committee Chairman: Joseph W. Martin Jr.
 Republican Campaign Committee Chairman: Leonard W. Hall

Caucuses
 House Democratic Caucus
 Senate Democratic Caucus

Members

Senate
Senators are popularly elected statewide every two years, with one-third beginning new six-year terms with each Congress. Senators are ordered first by state, and then by seniority. Preceding the names in the list below are Senate class numbers, which indicate the cycle of their election, In this Congress, Class 3 meant their term ended with this Congress, requiring reelection in 1950; Class 1 meant their term began in the last Congress, requiring reelection in 1952; and Class 2 meant their term began in this Congress, requiring reelection in 1954.

Alabama 
 2. John Sparkman (D)
 3. J. Lister Hill (D)

Arizona 
 1. Ernest McFarland (D)
 3. Carl Hayden (D)

Arkansas 
 2. John L. McClellan (D)
 3. J. William Fulbright (D)

California 
 1. William Knowland (R)
 3. Sheridan Downey (D), until November 30, 1950
 Richard Nixon (R), from December 1, 1950

Colorado 
 2. Edwin C. Johnson (D)
 3. Eugene Millikin (R)

Connecticut 
 1. Raymond E. Baldwin (R), until December 16, 1949
 William Benton (D), from December 17, 1949
 3. Brien McMahon (D)

Delaware 
 1. John J. Williams (R)
 2. J. Allen Frear Jr. (D)

Florida 
 1. Spessard Holland (D)
 3. Claude Pepper (D)

Georgia 
 2. Walter F. George (D)
 3. Richard Russell Jr. (D)

Idaho 
 2. Bert H. Miller (D), until October 8, 1949
 Henry Dworshak (R), from October 14, 1949
 3. Glen H. Taylor (D)

Illinois 
 2. Paul Douglas (D)
 3. Scott W. Lucas (D)

Indiana 
 1. William E. Jenner (R)
 3. Homer E. Capehart (R)

Iowa 
 2. Guy Gillette (D)
 3. Bourke B. Hickenlooper (R)

Kansas 
 2. Andrew Frank Schoeppel (R)
 3. Clyde M. Reed (R), until November 8, 1949
 Harry Darby (R), December 2, 1949 - November 28, 1950
 Frank Carlson (R), from November 29, 1950

Kentucky 
 2. Virgil Chapman (D)
 3. Alben W. Barkley (D), until January 19, 1949
 Garrett Withers (D), January 20, 1949 - November 26, 1950
 Earle Clements (D), from November 27, 1950

Louisiana 
 2. Allen J. Ellender (D)
 3. Russell B. Long (D)

Maine 
 1. Owen Brewster (R)
 2. Margaret Chase Smith (R)

Maryland 
 1. Herbert O'Conor (D)
 3. Millard Tydings (D)

Massachusetts 
 1. Henry Cabot Lodge Jr. (R)
 2. Leverett Saltonstall (R)

Michigan 
 1. Arthur Vandenberg (R)
 2. Homer S. Ferguson (R)

Minnesota 
 1. Edward John Thye (R)
 2. Hubert Humphrey (DFL)

Mississippi 
 1. John C. Stennis (D)
 2. James Eastland (D)

Missouri 
 1. James P. Kem (R)
 3. Forrest C. Donnell (R)

Montana 
 1. Zales Ecton (R)
 2. James E. Murray (D)

Nebraska 
 1. Hugh A. Butler (R)
 2. Kenneth S. Wherry (R)

Nevada 
 1. George W. Malone (R)
 3. Pat McCarran (D)

New Hampshire 
 2. Styles Bridges (R)
 3. Charles W. Tobey (R)

New Jersey 
 1. Howard Alexander Smith (R)
 2. Robert C. Hendrickson (R)

New Mexico 
 1. Dennis Chávez (D)
 2. Clinton Anderson (D)

New York 
 1. Irving Ives (R)
 3. Robert F. Wagner (D), until June 28, 1949
 John Foster Dulles (R), July 7, 1949 - November 8, 1949
 Herbert H. Lehman (D), from November 9, 1949

North Carolina 
 2. J. Melville Broughton (D), until March 6, 1949
 Frank Porter Graham (D), March 29, 1949 - November 26, 1950
 Willis Smith (D), from November 27, 1950
 3. Clyde R. Hoey (D)

North Dakota 
 1. William Langer (R-NPL)
 3. Milton Young (R)

Ohio 
 1. John W. Bricker (R)
 3. Robert A. Taft (R)

Oklahoma 
 2. Robert S. Kerr (D)
 3. Elmer Thomas (D)

Oregon 
 2. Guy Cordon (R)
 3. Wayne Morse (R)

Pennsylvania 
 1. Edward Martin (R)
 3. Francis J. Myers (D)

Rhode Island 
 1. J. Howard McGrath (D), until August 23, 1949
 Edward L. Leahy (D), August 24, 1949 - December 18, 1950
 John Pastore (D), from December 19, 1950
 2. Theodore F. Green (D)

South Carolina 
 2. Burnet R. Maybank (D)
 3. Olin D. Johnston (D)

South Dakota 
 2. Karl E. Mundt (R)
 3. John Chandler Gurney (R)

Tennessee 
 1. Kenneth McKellar (D)
 2. Estes Kefauver (D)

Texas 
 1. Tom Connally (D)
 2. Lyndon B. Johnson (D)

Utah 
 1. Arthur Vivian Watkins (R)
 3. Elbert D. Thomas (D)

Vermont 
 1. Ralph Flanders (R)
 3. George Aiken (R)

Virginia 
 1. Harry F. Byrd (D)
 2. Absalom Willis Robertson (D)

Washington 
 1. Harry P. Cain (R)
 3. Warren Magnuson (D)

West Virginia 
 1. Harley M. Kilgore (D)
 2. Matthew M. Neely (D)

Wisconsin 
 1. Joseph McCarthy (R)
 3. Alexander Wiley (R)

Wyoming 
 1. Joseph C. O'Mahoney (D)
 2. Lester C. Hunt (D)

House of Representatives

Alabama 
 . Frank W. Boykin (D)
 . George M. Grant (D)
 . George W. Andrews (D)
 . Sam Hobbs (D)
 . Albert Rains (D)
 . Edward deGraffenried (D)
 . Carl Elliott (D)
 . Robert E. Jones Jr. (D)
 . Laurie C. Battle (D)

Arizona 
 . John R. Murdock (D)
 . Harold Patten (D)

Arkansas 
 . Ezekiel C. Gathings (D)
 . Wilbur Mills (D)
 . James William Trimble (D)
 . Boyd Anderson Tackett (D)
 . Brooks Hays (D)
 . William F. Norrell (D)
 . Oren Harris (D)

California 
 . Hubert B. Scudder (R)
 . Clair Engle (D)
 . J. Leroy Johnson (R)
 . Franck R. Havenner (D)
 . Richard J. Welch (R), until September 10, 1949
 John F. Shelley (D), from November 8, 1949
 . George P. Miller (D)
 . John J. Allen Jr. (R)
 . Jack Z. Anderson (R)
 . Cecil F. White (D)
 . Thomas H. Werdel (R)
 . Ernest K. Bramblett (R)
 . Richard Nixon (R), until November 30, 1950
 . Norris Poulson (R)
 . Helen Gahagan Douglas (D)
 . Gordon L. McDonough (R)
 . Donald L. Jackson (R)
 . Cecil R. King (D)
 . Clyde Doyle (D)
 . Chester E. Holifield (D)
 . John Carl Hinshaw (R)
 . Harry R. Sheppard (D)
 . John R. Phillips (R)
 . Clinton D. McKinnon (D)

Colorado 
 . John A. Carroll (D)
 . William S. Hill (R)
 . John H. Marsalis (D)
 . Wayne N. Aspinall (D)

Connecticut 
 . Antoni Sadlak (R)
 . Abraham Ribicoff (D)
 . Chase G. Woodhouse (D)
 . John A. McGuire (D)
 . John Davis Lodge (R)
 . James T. Patterson (R)

Delaware 
 . J. Caleb Boggs (R)

Florida 
 . J. Hardin Peterson (D)
 . Charles E. Bennett (D)
 . Bob Sikes (D)
 . George Smathers (D)
 . Syd Herlong (D)
 . Dwight L. Rogers (D)

Georgia 
 . Prince Hulon Preston Jr. (D)
 . Edward E. Cox (D)
 . Stephen Pace (D)
 . Albert Sidney Camp (D)
 . James C. Davis (D)
 . Carl Vinson (D)
 . Henderson Lovelace Lanham (D)
 . William McDonald Wheeler (D)
 . John Stephens Wood (D)
 . Paul Brown (D)

Idaho 
 . Compton I. White (D)
 . John C. Sanborn (R)

Illinois 
 . William L. Dawson (D)
 . Barratt O'Hara (D)
 . Neil J. Linehan (D)
 . James V. Buckley (D)
 . Martin Gorski (D), until December 4, 1949
 . Thomas J. O'Brien (D)
 . Adolph J. Sabath (D)
 . Thomas S. Gordon (D)
 . Sidney R. Yates (D)
 . Richard W. Hoffman (R)
 . Chester A. Chesney (D)
 . Edgar A. Jonas (R)
 . Ralph E. Church (R), until March 21, 1950
 . Chauncey W. Reed (R)
 . Noah M. Mason (R)
 . Leo E. Allen (R)
 . Leslie C. Arends (R)
 . Harold H. Velde (R)
 . Robert B. Chiperfield (R)
 . Sid Simpson (R)
 . Peter F. Mack Jr. (D)
 . Rolla C. McMillen (R)
 . Edward H. Jenison (R)
 . Charles W. Vursell (R)
 . Melvin Price (D)
 . C. W. Bishop (R)

Indiana 
 . Ray Madden (D)
 . Charles A. Halleck (R)
 . Thurman C. Crook (D)
 . Edward H. Kruse (D)
 . John R. Walsh (D)
 . Cecil M. Harden (R)
 . James Ellsworth Noland (D)
 . Winfield K. Denton (D)
 . Earl Wilson (R)
 . Ralph Harvey (R)
 . Andrew Jacobs (D)

Iowa 
 . Thomas E. Martin (R)
 . Henry O. Talle (R)
 . H. R. Gross (R)
 . Karl M. LeCompte (R)
 . Paul H. Cunningham (R)
 . James I. Dolliver (R)
 . Ben F. Jensen (R)
 . Charles B. Hoeven (R)

Kansas 
 . Albert M. Cole (R)
 . Errett P. Scrivner (R)
 . Herbert Alton Meyer (R), until October 2, 1950
 Myron V. George (R), from November 7, 1950
 . Edward Herbert Rees (R)
 . Clifford R. Hope (R)
 . Wint Smith (R)

Kentucky 
 . Noble J. Gregory (D)
 . John A. Whitaker (D)
 . Thruston Ballard Morton (R)
 . Frank Chelf (D)
 . Brent Spence (D)
 . Thomas R. Underwood (D)
 . Carl D. Perkins (D)
 . Joe B. Bates (D)
 . James S. Golden (R)

Louisiana 
 . F. Edward Hébert (D)
 . Hale Boggs (D)
 . Edwin E. Willis (D)
 . Overton Brooks (D)
 . Otto Passman (D)
 . James H. Morrison (D)
 . Henry D. Larcade Jr. (D)
 . A. Leonard Allen (D)

Maine 
 . Robert Hale (R)
 . Charles P. Nelson (R)
 . Frank Fellows (R)

Maryland 
 . Edward Tylor Miller (R)
 . William P. Bolton (D)
 . Edward Garmatz (D)
 . George Hyde Fallon (D)
 . Lansdale G. Sasscer (D)
 . James Glenn Beall (R)

Massachusetts 
 . John W. Heselton (R)
 . Foster Furcolo (D)
 . Philip J. Philbin (D)
 . Harold Donohue (D)
 . Edith Nourse Rogers (R)
 . George J. Bates (R), until November 1, 1949
 William H. Bates (R), from February 14, 1950
 . Thomas J. Lane (D)
 . Angier Goodwin (R)
 . Donald W. Nicholson (R)
 . Christian Herter (R)
 . John F. Kennedy (D)
 . John W. McCormack (D)
 . Richard B. Wigglesworth (R)
 . Joseph W. Martin Jr. (R)

Michigan 
 . George G. Sadowski (D)
 . Earl C. Michener (R)
 . Paul W. Shafer (R)
 . Clare Hoffman (R)
 . Gerald Ford (R)
 . William W. Blackney (R)
 . Jesse P. Wolcott (R)
 . Fred L. Crawford (R)
 . Albert J. Engel (R)
 . Roy O. Woodruff (R)
 . Charles E. Potter (R)
 . John B. Bennett (R)
 . George D. O'Brien (D)
 . Louis C. Rabaut (D)
 . John Dingell Sr. (D)
 . John Lesinski Sr. (D), until May 27, 1950
 . George Anthony Dondero (R)

Minnesota 
 . August H. Andresen (R)
 . Joseph P. O'Hara (R)
 . Roy Wier (DFL)
 . Eugene McCarthy (DFL)
 . Walter Judd (R)
 . Fred Marshall (DFL)
 . Herman Carl Andersen (R)
 . John Blatnik (DFL)
 . Harold Hagen (R)

Mississippi 
 . John E. Rankin (D)
 . Jamie Whitten (D)
 . William Madison Whittington (D)
 . Thomas Abernethy (D)
 . W. Arthur Winstead (D)
 . William M. Colmer (D)
 . John Bell Williams (D)

Missouri 
 . Clare Magee (D)
 . Morgan M. Moulder (D)
 . Phil J. Welch (D)
 . Leonard Irving (D)
 . Richard Walker Bolling (D)
 . George H. Christopher (D)
 . Dewey Jackson Short (R)
 . A. S. J. Carnahan (D)
 . Clarence Cannon (D)
 . Paul C. Jones (D)
 . John B. Sullivan (D)
 . Raymond W. Karst (D)
 . Frank M. Karsten (D)

Montana 
 . Mike Mansfield (D)
 . Wesley A. D'Ewart (R)

Nebraska 
 . Carl Curtis (R)
 . Eugene D. O'Sullivan (D)
 . Karl Stefan (R)
 . Arthur L. Miller (R)

Nevada 
 . Walter S. Baring Jr. (D)

New Hampshire 
 . Chester Earl Merrow (R)
 . Norris Cotton (R)

New Jersey 
 . Charles A. Wolverton (R)
 . T. Millet Hand (R)
 . James C. Auchincloss (R)
 . Charles R. Howell (D)
 . Charles A. Eaton (R)
 . Clifford P. Case (R)
 . J. Parnell Thomas (R), until January 2, 1950
 William B. Widnall (R), from February 6, 1950
 . Gordon Canfield (R)
 . Harry L. Towe (R)
 . Peter W. Rodino (D)
 . Hugh Joseph Addonizio (D)
 . Robert Kean (R)
 . Mary Teresa Norton (D)
 . Edward J. Hart (D)

New Mexico 
 . John E. Miles (D)
 . Antonio M. Fernández (D)

New York 
 . W. Kingsland Macy (R)
 . Leonard W. Hall (R)
 . Henry J. Latham (R)
 . L. Gary Clemente (D)
 . T. Vincent Quinn (D)
 . James J. Delaney (D)
 . Louis B. Heller (D), from February 15, 1949
 . Joseph L. Pfeifer (D)
 . Eugene James Keogh (D)
 . Andrew Lawrence Somers (D), until April 6, 1949
 Edna F. Kelly (D), from November 8, 1949
 . James J. Heffernan (D)
 . John J. Rooney (D)
 . Donald Lawrence O'Toole (D)
 . Abraham J. Multer (D)
 . Emanuel Celler (D)
 . James J. Murphy (D)
 . Frederic René Coudert Jr. (R)
 . Vito Marcantonio (AL)
 . Arthur George Klein (D)
 . Sol Bloom (D), until March 7, 1949
 Franklin Delano Roosevelt Jr. (Lib.), from May 17, 1949
 . Jacob Javits (R)
 . Adam Clayton Powell Jr. (D)
 . Walter A. Lynch (D)
 . Isidore Dollinger (D)
 . Charles A. Buckley (D)
 . Christopher C. McGrath (D)
 . Ralph W. Gwinn (R)
 . Ralph A. Gamble (R)
 . Katharine St. George (R)
 . Jay Le Fevre (R)
 . Bernard W. Kearney (R)
 . William T. Byrne (D)
 . Dean P. Taylor (R)
 . Clarence E. Kilburn (R)
 . John C. Davies II (D)
 . R. Walter Riehlman (R)
 . Edwin Arthur Hall (R)
 . John Taber (R)
 . W. Sterling Cole (R)
 . Kenneth Keating (R)
 . James Wolcott Wadsworth Jr. (R)
 . William L. Pfeiffer (R)
 . Anthony F. Tauriello (D)
 . Chester C. Gorski (D)
 . Daniel A. Reed (R)

North Carolina 
 . Herbert Covington Bonner (D)
 . John H. Kerr (D)
 . Graham A. Barden (D)
 . Harold D. Cooley (D)
 . Richard Thurmond Chatham (D)
 . Carl T. Durham (D)
 . Frank Ertel Carlyle (D)
 . Charles B. Deane (D)
 . Robert L. Doughton (D)
 . Hamilton C. Jones (D)
 . Alfred L. Bulwinkle (D), until August 31, 1950
 Woodrow W. Jones (D), from November 7, 1950
 . Monroe Minor Redden (D)

North Dakota 
 . William Lemke (R), until May 30, 1950
 . Usher L. Burdick (R-NPL)

Ohio 
 . Charles H. Elston (R)
 . Earl T. Wagner (D)
 . Edward G. Breen (D)
 . William Moore McCulloch (R)
 . Cliff Clevenger (R)
 . James G. Polk (D)
 . Clarence J. Brown (R)
 . Frederick C. Smith (R)
 . Thomas H. Burke (D)
 . Thomas A. Jenkins (R)
 . Walter E. Brehm (R)
 . John Martin Vorys (R)
 . Alvin F. Weichel (R)
 . Walter B. Huber (D)
 . Robert T. Secrest (D)
 . John McSweeney (D)
 . J. Harry McGregor (R)
 . Wayne Hays (D)
 . Michael J. Kirwan (D)
 . Michael A. Feighan (D)
 . Robert Crosser (D)
 . Frances P. Bolton (R)
 . Stephen M. Young (D)

Oklahoma 
 . Dixie Gilmer (D)
 . William G. Stigler (D)
 . Carl Albert (D)
 . Tom Steed (D)
 . Mike Monroney (D)
 . Toby Morris (D)
 . Victor Wickersham (D)
 . George H. Wilson (D)

Oregon 
 . A. Walter Norblad (R)
 . Lowell Stockman (R)
 . Homer D. Angell (R)
 . Harris Ellsworth (R)

Pennsylvania 
 . William A. Barrett (D)
 . William T. Granahan (D)
 . Hardie Scott (R)
 . Earl Chudoff (D)
 . William J. Green Jr. (D)
 . Hugh Scott (R)
 . Benjamin F. James (R)
 . Franklin H. Lichtenwalter (R)
 . Paul B. Dague (R)
 . Harry P. O'Neill (D)
 . Dan Flood (D)
 . Ivor D. Fenton (R)
 . George M. Rhodes (D)
 . Wilson D. Gillette (R)
 . Robert F. Rich (R)
 . Samuel K. McConnell Jr. (R)
 . Richard M. Simpson (R)
 . John C. Kunkel (R)
 . Leon H. Gavin (R)
 . Francis E. Walter (D)
 . James F. Lind (D)
 . James E. Van Zandt (R)
 . Anthony Cavalcante (D)
 . Thomas E. Morgan (D)
 . Louis E. Graham (R)
 . Robert L. Coffey (D), until April 20, 1949
 John P. Saylor (R), from September 13, 1949
 . Augustine B. Kelley (D)
 . Carroll D. Kearns (R)
 . Harry J. Davenport (D)
 . Robert J. Corbett (R)
 . James G. Fulton (R)
 . Herman P. Eberharter (D)
 . Frank Buchanan (D)

Rhode Island 
 . Aime Forand (D)
 . John E. Fogarty (D)

South Carolina 
 . L. Mendel Rivers (D)
 . Hugo S. Sims Jr. (D)
 . James Butler Hare (D)
 . Joseph R. Bryson (D)
 . James P. Richards (D)
 . John L. McMillan (D)

South Dakota 
 . Harold Lovre (R)
 . Francis H. Case (R)

Tennessee 
 . Dayton E. Phillips (R)
 . John Jennings (R)
 . James B. Frazier Jr. (D)
 . Albert Gore Sr. (D)
 . Joe L. Evins (D)
 . Percy Priest (D)
 . James Patrick Sutton (D)
 . Tom J. Murray (D)
 . Jere Cooper (D)
 . Clifford Davis (D)

Texas 
 . Wright Patman (D)
 . Jesse M. Combs (D)
 . Lindley Beckworth (D)
 . Sam Rayburn (D)
 . Joseph Franklin Wilson (D)
 . Olin E. Teague (D)
 . Tom Pickett (D)
 . Albert Thomas (D)
 . Clark W. Thompson (D)
 . Homer Thornberry (D)
 . William R. Poage (D)
 . Wingate H. Lucas (D)
 . Ed Gossett (D)
 . John E. Lyle Jr. (D)
 . Lloyd Bentsen (D)
 . Kenneth M. Regan (D)
 . Omar Burleson (D)
 . Eugene Worley (D), until April 3, 1950
 Ben H. Guill (R), from May 6, 1950
 . George H. Mahon (D)
 . Paul J. Kilday (D)
 . O. C. Fisher (D)

Utah 
 . Walter K. Granger (D)
 . Reva Beck Bosone (D)

Vermont 
 . Charles Albert Plumley (R)

Virginia 
 . S. Otis Bland (D), until February 16, 1950
 Edward J. Robeson Jr. (D), from May 2, 1950
 . Porter Hardy Jr. (D)
 . J. Vaughan Gary (D)
 . Watkins Moorman Abbitt (D)
 . Thomas B. Stanley (D)
 . Clarence G. Burton (D)
 . Burr Harrison (D)
 . Howard W. Smith (D)
 . Thomas B. Fugate (D)

Washington 
 . Hugh Mitchell (D)
 . Henry M. Jackson (D)
 . Russell V. Mack (R)
 . Hal Holmes (R)
 . Walt Horan (R)
 . Thor C. Tollefson (R)

West Virginia 
 . Robert L. Ramsay (D)
 . Harley Orrin Staggers (D)
 . Cleveland M. Bailey (D)
 . Maurice G. Burnside (D)
 . John Kee (D)
 . E. H. Hedrick (D)

Wisconsin 
 . Lawrence H. Smith (R)
 . Glenn Robert Davis (R)
 . Gardner R. Withrow (R)
 . Clement J. Zablocki (D)
 . Andrew Biemiller (D)
 . Frank B. Keefe (R)
 . Reid F. Murray (R)
 . John W. Byrnes (R)
 . Merlin Hull (R)
 . Alvin O'Konski (R)

Wyoming 
 . Frank A. Barrett (R), until December 31, 1950

Non-voting members 
 . Bob Bartlett (D)
 . Joseph Rider Farrington (R)
 . Antonio Fernós-Isern (PPD)

Changes in membership
The count below reflects changes from the beginning of this Congress.

Senate

|-
| Kentucky(3)
| nowrap  | Alben W. Barkley (D)
| Incumbent resigned January 19, 1949, to become U.S. Vice President.Successor appointed January 20, 1949, to finish the term.
| nowrap  | Garrett Withers (D)
| January 20, 1949

|-
| North Carolina(2)
| nowrap  | J. Melville Broughton (D)
| Incumbent died March 6, 1949.Successor appointed March 29, 1949, to continue the term.
| nowrap  | Frank Porter Graham (D)
| March 29, 1949

|-
| New York(3)
| nowrap  | Robert F. Wagner (D)
| Incumbent resigned June 28, 1949, due to ill health.Successor appointed July 7, 1949, to continue the term.
| nowrap  | John Foster Dulles (R)
| July 7, 1949

|-
| Rhode Island(1)
| nowrap  | J. Howard McGrath (D)
| Incumbent resigned August 23, 1949, to become U.S. Attorney General.Successor appointed to continue the term.
| nowrap  | Edward L. Leahy (D)
| August 24, 1949

|-
| Idaho(2)
| nowrap  | Bert H. Miller (D)
| Incumbent died October 8, 1949.Successor appointed to continue the term.Successor later elected November 7, 1950.
| nowrap  | Henry Dworshak (R)
| October 14, 1949

|-
| Kansas(3)
| nowrap  | Clyde M. Reed (R)
| Incumbent died November 8, 1949.Successor appointed to continue the term.
| nowrap  | Harry Darby (R)
| December 2, 1949

|-
| New York(3)
| nowrap  | John Foster Dulles (R)
| Interim appointee lost November 8, 1949, election to finish the term.Successor elected November 8, 1949.
| nowrap  | Herbert H. Lehman (D)
| November 9, 1949

|-
| Connecticut(1)
| nowrap  | Raymond E. Baldwin (R)
| Incumbent resigned December 16, 1949.Successor appointed to continue the term.Successor later elected November 7, 1950.
| nowrap  | William Benton (D)
| December 17, 1949

|-
| Kentucky(3)
| nowrap  | Garrett Withers (D)
| Interim appointee resigned November 26, 1950, to trigger special election.Successor elected November 7, 1950.
| nowrap  | Earle Clements (D)
| November 27, 1950

|-
| North Carolina(2)
| nowrap  | Frank Porter Graham (D)
| Interim appointee lost November 7, 1950, election to finish the term.Successor elected November 7, 1950.
| nowrap  | Willis Smith (D)
| November 27, 1950

|-
| Kansas(3)
| nowrap  | Harry Darby (R)
| Interim appointee retired November 28, 1950, when successor elected.Successor elected November 29, 1950.
| nowrap  | Frank Carlson (R)
| November 29, 1950

|-
| California(3)
| nowrap  | Sheridan Downey (D)
| Incumbent resigned November 30, 1950, due to ill health.Successor appointed to finish term, having already been elected to the next term.
| nowrap  | Richard Nixon (R)
| December 1, 1950

|-
| Rhode Island(1)
| nowrap  | Edward L. Leahy (D)
| Interim appointee retired December 18, 1950, when successor elected.Successor elected December 19, 1950.
| nowrap  | John Pastore (D)
| December 19, 1950

|}

House of Representatives

|-
| 
| Vacant
| Rep. John J. Delaney died during previous congress
|  nowrap | Louis B. Heller (D)
| February 15, 1949

|-
| 
|  nowrap | Sol Bloom (D)
| Died March 7, 1949.
|  |  
| May 17, 1949

|-
| 
|  nowrap | Andrew Lawrence Somers (D)
| Died April 6, 1949.
|  nowrap | Edna F. Kelly (D)
| November 8, 1949

|-
| 
|  nowrap | Robert L. Coffey (D)
| Died April 20, 1949.
|  nowrap | John P. Saylor (R)
| September 13, 1949

|-
| 
|  nowrap | Richard J. Welch (R)
| Died September 10, 1949.
|  nowrap | John F. Shelley (D)
| November 8, 1949

|-
| 
|  nowrap | George J. Bates (R)
| Died November 1, 1949.
|  nowrap | William H. Bates (R)
| February 14, 1950

|-
| 
|  nowrap | Martin Gorski (D)
| Died December 4, 1949.
| Vacant
| Not filled for the remainder of this term

|-
| 
|  nowrap | J. Parnell Thomas (R)
| Resigned January 2, 1950, following conviction on charges of salary fraud.
|  nowrap | William B. Widnall (R)
| February 6, 1950

|-
| 
|  nowrap | S. Otis Bland (D)
| Died February 16, 1950.
|  nowrap | Edward J. Robeson Jr. (D)
| May 2, 1950

|-
| 
|  nowrap | Ralph E. Church (R)
| Died March 21, 1950.
| Vacant
| Not filled for the remainder of this term

|-
| 
|  nowrap | Eugene Worley (D)
| Resigned April 3, 1950, to become associate judge of the United States Court of Customs and Patent Appeals.
|  nowrap | Ben H. Guill (R)
| May 6, 1950

|-
| 
|  nowrap | John Lesinski Sr. (D)
| Died May 27, 1950.
| Vacant
| Not filled for the remainder of this term

|-
| 
|  nowrap | William Lemke (R)
| Died May 30, 1950.
| Vacant
| Not filled for the remainder of this term

|-
| 
|  nowrap | Alfred L. Bulwinkle (D)
| Died August 31, 1950.
|  nowrap | Woodrow W. Jones (D)
| November 7, 1950

|-
| 
|  nowrap | Herbert Alton Meyer (R)
| Died October 2, 1950.
|  nowrap | Myron V. George (R)
| November 7, 1950

|-
| 
|  nowrap | Richard Nixon (R)
| Resigned November 30, 1950, after being appointed to the U.S. Senate having already been elected.
| Vacant
| Not filled for the remainder of this term

|-
| 
|  nowrap | Frank A. Barrett (R)
| Resigned December 31, 1950, after being elected Governor of Wyoming.
| Vacant
| Not filled for the remainder of this term

|}

Committees

Senate

 Agriculture and Forestry (Chairman: Elmer Thomas; Ranking Member: George D. Aiken)
 Appropriations (Chairman: Kenneth McKellar; Ranking Member: Styles Bridges)
 Armed Services (Chairman: Millard E. Tydings; Ranking Member: Styles Bridges)
 Banking and Currency (Chairman: Burnet R. Maybank; Ranking Member: Charles W. Tobey)
 District of Columbia (Chairman: Matthew M. Neely; Ranking Member: John J. Williams)
 Expenditures in Executive Departments (Chairman: John L. McClellan; Ranking Member: Joseph R. McCarthy)
 Finance (Chairman: Walter F. George; Ranking Member: Eugene D. Millikin)
 Foreign Relations (Chairman: Tom Connally; Ranking Member: Arthur H. Vandenberg)
 Interior and Insular Affairs (Chairman: Joseph C. O'Mahoney; Ranking Member: Hugh Butler)
 Subcommittee on Internal Security
 Interstate and Foreign Commerce (Chairman: Edwin C. Johnson; Ranking Member: Charles W. Tobey)
 Judiciary (Chairman: Pat McCarran; Ranking Member: Alexander Wiley)
 Labor and Public Welfare (Chairman: Elbert D. Thomas; Ranking Member: Robert A. Taft)
 Organized Crime in Interstate Commerce (Select)
 Post Office and Civil Service (Chairman: Frank Carlson; Ranking Member: Olin D. Johnston)
 Public Works (Chairman: Dennis Chavez; Ranking Member: William Langer)
 Remodeling the Senate Chamber (Special)
 Rules and Administration (Chairman: Carl Hayden; Ranking Member: Kenneth S. Wherry)
 Small Business (Select)
 Small Business Enterprises (Special)
 Whole

House of Representatives

 Agriculture (Chairman: Harold D. Cooley; Ranking Member: Clifford R. Hope)
 Appropriations (Chairman: Clarence Cannon; Ranking Member: John Taber)
 Armed Services (Chairman: Carl Vinson; Ranking Member: Dewey Jackson Short)
 Banking and Currency (Chairman: Brent Spence; Ranking Member: Jesse P. Wolcott)
 District of Columbia (Chairman: John L. McMillan; Ranking Member: George J. Bates)
 Education and Labor (Chairman: John Lesinski; Ranking Member: Samuel K. McConnell Jr.)
 Expenditures in the Executive Departments (Chairman: William L. Dawson; Ranking Member: Clare E. Hoffman)
 Foreign Affairs (Chairman: John Kee; Ranking Member: Charles Aubrey Eaton)
 House Administration (Chairman: Mary Teresa Norton; Ranking Member: Karl M. LeCompte)
 Investigate Educational, Training, and Loan Guaranty Programs under the G.I. Bill (Select) (Chairman: Olin E. Teague)
 Investigate the Use of Chemicals in Food and Cosmetics (Select) (Chairman: N/A)
 Interstate and Foreign Commerce (Chairman: Robert Crosser; Ranking Member: Charles A. Wolverton)
 Judiciary (Chairman: Emanuel Celler; Ranking: Earl C. Michener)
 Lobbying Activities (Select) (Chairman: Frank Buchanan)
 Merchant Marine and Fisheries (Chairman: S. Otis Bland; Ranking Member: Alvin F. Weichel)
 Post Office and Civil Service (Chairman: Tom J. Murray; Ranking Member: Edward H. Rees)
 Public Lands (Chairman: J. Hardin Peterson; Ranking Member: Richard J. Welch then Fred L. Crawford)
 Public Works (Chairman: William M. Whittington; Ranking Member: George Anthony Dondero)
 Rules (Chairman: Adolph J. Sabath; Ranking Member: Leo E. Allen)
 Small Business (Select) (Chairman: Wright Patman)
 Standards of Official Conduct
 Un-American Activities (Chairman: John S. Wood; Ranking Member: J. Parnell Thomas)
 Veterans' Affairs (Chairman: John E. Rankin; Ranking Member: Edith Nourse Rogers)
 Ways and Means (Chairman: Robert L. Doughton; Ranking Member: Daniel A. Reed)
 Whole

Joint committees

 Atomic Energy (Chairman: Sen. Brien McMahon; Vice Chairman: Rep. Carl T. Durham)
 Conditions of Indian Tribes (Special)
 Defense Production
 Disposition of Executive Papers
 Foreign Economic Cooperation (Chairman: Sen. Pat McCarran)
 Economic (Chairman: Sen. Joseph C. O'Mahoney; Vice Chairman: Rep. Edward J. Hart)
 Labor Management Relations (Chairman: Sen. James E. Murray; Vice Chairman: Rep. John Lesinski)
 Legislative Budget
 The Library (Chairman: Sen. Theodore F. Green)
 Navajo-Hopi Indian Administration
 Arrange the Inauguration for President-elect (Chairman: Sen. Carl Hayden)
 Printing (Chairman: Sen. Carl Hayden; Vice Chairman: Rep. Mary Teresa Norton)
 Reduction of Nonessential Federal Expenditures
 Taxation (Chairman: Rep. Robert L. Doughton; Vice Chairman: Sen. Walter F. George)

Employees

Legislative branch agency directors
 Architect of the Capitol: David Lynn
 Attending Physician of the United States Congress: George Calver
 Comptroller General of the United States: Lindsay C. Warren
 Librarian of Congress: Luther H. Evans 
 Public Printer of the United States: John J. Deviny

Senate
 Chaplain: Peter Marshall (Presbyterian), until January 26, 1949
 Frederick Brown Harris (Methodist), from February 3, 1949
 Parliamentarian: Charles Watkins
 Secretary: Leslie Biffle
 Librarian: George W. Straubinger
 Secretary for the Majority: Felton McLellan Johnston
 Secretary for the Minority: J. Mark Trice
 Sergeant at Arms: Joseph C. Duke

House of Representatives
 Chaplain: James Shera Montgomery (Methodist), until January 3, 1950 
 Bernard Braskamp (Presbyterian), from January 3, 1950
 Clerk: Ralph R. Roberts
 Doorkeeper: William Mosley "Fishbait" Miller
 Parliamentarian: Lewis Deschler
 Postmaster: Finis E. Scott
 Reading Clerks: George J. Maurer (D) and Alney E. Chaffee (R)
 Sergeant at Arms: Joseph H. Callahan

See also 
 1948 United States elections (elections leading to this Congress)
 1948 United States presidential election
 1948 United States Senate elections
 1948 United States House of Representatives elections
 1950 United States elections (elections during this Congress, leading to the next Congress)
 1950 United States Senate elections
 1950 United States House of Representatives elections

Notes

References

 House of Representatives Session Calendar for the 81st Congress. Washington, D.C.: United States Government Printing Office. 1951.
 Official Congressional Directory for the 81st Congress, 1st Session. Washington, D.C.: United States Government Printing Office. 1949.
 Official Congressional Directory for the 81st Congress, 2nd Session. Washington, D.C.: United States Government Printing Office. 1950.